Stuffed is the debut album released by Melbourne-based New Zealand Mother Goose. The album spawned their biggest hit Baked Beans, a novelty song purporting the romance-promoting properties of the titular dish, and it went to number one in all of Australia.

Track list

Side One
 Moonshine Lady (Steve Young) - 4:10
 Somebody Broke My Heart (Young, Pete Dickson, Craig Johnson) - 4:03
 Last of The Fools (Young, Dickson, Johnston, Kevin Collings, Denis Gibbens, Marcel Rodeka) - 6:36
 (Some Day You'll Be Sorry) Anne Marie (Johnston, Dickson) - 5:23

Side Two
 Land Ho (Young) - 5:38
 See If I Care (Johnston, Dickson, Young) - 4:27
 Only You (Young) - 3:16
 Only A Phone Call Away (Young, Dickson, Johnston, Collings, Gibbens, Rodeka) - 5:13
 Baked Beans (Young, Dickson, Johnston, Collings, Gibbens, Rodeka) - 3:42

Charts

Personnel
 Craig Johnston - lead vocals
 Pete Dickson - lead guitar, backing vocals
 Kevin Collings - rhythm guitar, backing vocals
 Steve Young - keyboards, backing vocals
 Denis Gibbins - bass, backing vocals
 Marcel Rodeka - drums, percussion

Technical
 Mother Goose - producers, cover concept
 Ross Cockle - producer, engineer
 Kym Faehse - artwork, design

References

1977 debut albums
Mushroom Records albums